Events from the year 1927 in France.

Incumbents
President: Gaston Doumergue 
President of the Council of Ministers: Raymond Poincaré

Events
20 May–21 May – First solo non-stop Trans-Atlantic flight from New York to Paris by Charles Lindbergh.
13 June – Léon Daudet, leader of French monarchists, is arrested after barricading himself into his house to avoid the police.
18 October – The Schwartzbard trial, relating to the murder of Symon Petliura, begins.

Sport
19 June – Tour de France begins.
17 July – Tour de France ends, won by Nicolas Frantz of Luxembourg.

Births

January to March
1 January – Maurice Béjart, choreographer who ran the Béjart Ballet Lausanne (died 2007)
7 February – Juliette Gréco, singer and actress (died 2020)
20 February – Hubert de Givenchy, aristocrat and fashion designer (died 2018)
23 February – Régine Crespin, opera singer (died 2007)
7 March – Philippe Clay, mime artist, singer and actor (died 2007)
19 March – Gisèle Lestrange, graphic artist (died 1991)
27 March – François Furet, historian (died 1997)

April to June
15 April – Maurice Ronet, actor, director and writer (died 1983)
25 April – Albert Uderzo, comic book artist and scriptwriter (died 2020)
3 May – Jean-Paul Martin-du-Gard, athlete (died 2017)
4 May – Jacques Lanzmann, writer, scriptwriter and lyric writer (died 2006)
18 May – François Nourissier, journalist and writer (died 2011)
24 May – Claude Abbes, international soccer player (died 2008)
20 June – Bernard Cahier, Formula One photo-journalist (died 2008)

July to September
3 July – Pierre Cahuzac, soccer player (died 2003)
13 July – Simone Veil, lawyer and politician (died 2017)
16 July – Serge Baudo, French conductor
17 July – Jean Casadesus, classical pianist (died 1972)
19 July – Hervé Pinoteau, historian and royalist apologist 
23 July – Gérard Brach, film director and screenwriter (died 2006)
27 July – Pierre Granier-Deferre, film director (died 2007)
14 August – Roger Carel, actor and voice talent (died 2020)
7 September – François Billetdoux, playwright and novelist (died 1991)
13 September – Maurice Lafont, international soccer player (died 2005)

October to December
19 October – Jean Bastien-Thiry, attempted assassin of President Charles de Gaulle in 1962 (died 1963)
24 October -
Gilbert Bécaud, singer, composer and actor (died 2001)
Jean-Claude Pascal, costume designer and singer (died 1992)
18 November – Gérard Calvet, Roman Catholic abbot (died 2008)
1 December – Micheline Bernardini, dancer and model
9 December – Pierre Henry, musique concrète composer (died 2017)
25 December – Georges Besse, businessman (assassinated 1986)
30 December – Robert Hossein, actor (died 2020)

Full date unknown
Claude Ponsard, economist (died 1990)

Deaths
12 March – Léon Denis, spiritist philosopher and researcher (born 1846)
23 March – Paul César Helleu, artist (born 1859)
15 April – Gaston Leroux, journalist, detective and novelist (born 1868)
18 June – Gustave Charles Fagniez, historian and economist (born 1842)
30 June – Édouard Louis Trouessart, zoologist (born 1842)
10 July – Louise Abbéma, painter and designer (born 1853)
4 August – Eugène Atget, photographer (born 1857)

See also
 List of French films of 1927

References

1920s in France